Ivoamba is rural municipality in Madagascar. It belongs to the district of Lalangina, which is a part of Haute Matsiatra Region. The population of the commune was estimated to be approximately 12,000 in 2001 commune census.

In addition to primary schooling the town offers secondary education at both junior and senior levels. The majority 88% of the population of the commune are farmers.  The most important crop is rice, while other important products are beans, maize and cassava. Industry and services provide employment for 8% and 2% of the population, respectively. Additionally fishing employs 2% of the population.

Cheese production
This municipality is well known for the production of cheese.

References and notes 

Populated places in Haute Matsiatra